The Dispatch is an American conservative subscription-based and advertisement-free online magazine founded by Jonah Goldberg, Stephen F. Hayes, and Toby Stock. Several of The Dispatch's staff (including Hayes) are alumni of the defunct The Weekly Standard.

History 
After The Weekly Standard ceased publication in December 2018, Hayes, Goldberg, and Stock were inspired to start a media company with the goal of "producing serious, factually grounded journalism for a conservative audience". Goldberg and Hayes expressed concern over the alliance between conservative media outlets and the Republican Party, and started The Dispatch with a desire to instead focus on conservative principles, regardless of party lines. The company is based in downtown Washington, D.C. By June 2020, The Dispatch had grown to twelve staffers.

The Dispatch began with a beta launch in October 2019 and fully launched on January 7, 2020. Hayes, Goldberg, and Stock own a majority of the company, but there are additional individual investors. The founders intentionally avoided using venture capitalists. At its launch in October 2019, The Dispatch had pooled $6 million in investment capital and had in its employ a full-time staff of eight individuals, including founding editor-in-chief Jonah Goldberg, managing editor Rachael Larimore, and (soon after its launch) senior editor David A. French. In January 2020, shortly after launching, The Dispatch Podcast appeared briefly on Apple's Top 100 news podcasts. By March 2020, the company claimed to have less than 10,000 paying subscribers.

The Poynter Institute's International Fact-Checking Network (IFCN) certified The Dispatchs fact-checking division in May 2020. As of September 2020, The Dispatch had nearly 100,000 subscribers, with almost 18,000 of them paying for the full service. The company pulled in nearly $2 million in revenue during its first year, most of which was from Substack subscriptions. The Dispatch was Substack's first media company. In October 2022, the publication moved from Substack to its own website.

The Dispatch has been sharply critical of Donald Trump from a center-right perspective. On 6 January 2021, after the 2021 storming of the United States Capitol, Rudy Giuliani left a voicemail message intended for Senator Tommy Tuberville on a different Senator's voicemail account. This message urged Tuberville to delay certification of the electoral vote: "Just try to slow it down." The unnamed Senator gave the message to The Dispatch, which immediately broke the story. The next day, The Dispatch published an editorial calling for the impeachment and removal of President Trump.

Content 
The Dispatch provides free web content, podcasts, and a mix of paid and free newsletters.  The Dispatch also produces a fact-checking column.

Newsletters
 The Morning Dispatch – a morning deep dive into the big political, and cultural stories of the day. Written by Declan Garvey and Esther Eaton.   
 The G-File – Jonah Goldberg's weekly Friday newsletter. There is also a paid Wednesday newsletter, nicknamed the "Hump Day Epistle."  
 French Press – David French's newsletter "about law, politics, faith, culture, and the superiority of DC over Marvel." It is published 4 times a week with a free edition on Sunday.  
 Vital Interests – a weekly newsletter focusing on threats to America's national security and interests around the globe. It's written by Thomas Joscelyn of the Foundation for the Defense of Democracies.
 The Dispatch Fact Check – a newsletter seeking to "identify and correct errors of fact, misstatements, misinformation and outright disinformation that make their way into the news stories and social media feeds every day." The Dispatch is one of Facebook's 10 third-party fact-checking partners in the United States. Written by Cameron Hilditch and edited by Rachael Larrimore and Steve Hayes.
 The Sweep - Sarah Isgur's newsletter covering elections and the ins and outs of campaign strategy. Chris Stirewalt, who was fired from Fox News after the 2020 election (allegedly for calling Arizona for Biden too soon), also contributes.
 Capitolism – Scott Lincicome's weekly newsletter about federal economic policy.
 The Current – A newsletter on technology and national security by Klon Kitchen 
 Wanderland – Kevin D. Williamson's weekly newsletter.

Podcasts
 The Dispatch Podcast –  hosted by Sarah Isgur, and co-starring David French, Jonah Goldberg, and Steven Hayes. Isgur and Hayes also host special editions interviewing people. 
 The Remnant – a podcast featuring conversations between Jonah Goldberg and a weekly guest that mixes "history, pop culture, rank-punditry, political philosophy, and, at times, shameless book-plugging". There is also a weekly solo podcast where Jonah discusses his thoughts on the news of the week, along with explaining his weekly G-file, nicknamed the "Ruminant".
 Advisory Opinions – podcast on law and culture with Sarah Isgur and David French.

Notable personnel 
 Stephen F. Hayes, CEO and co-founder
 Jonah Goldberg, Editor-in-chief and co-founder
 David A. French, senior editor
 Chris Stirewalt, contributing editor
 Sarah Isgur, staff writer and podcast host
 Nick Catoggio, staff writer.
 Kevin D. Williamson, national correspondent.

References

External links
 

2019 establishments in the United States
American political websites
Internet properties established in 2019
Conservative magazines published in the United States
Online magazines published in the United States
American conservative websites
Magazines established in 2019